Acacia mitodes is a shrub belonging to the genus Acacia and the subgenus Lycopodiifoliae. It is native to a small area in the Kimberley region of Western Australia.

The prostrate shrub produces yellow flowers from May to June.

See also
List of Acacia species

References

mitodes
Acacias of Western Australia
Taxa named by Alex George